Major General José María Aguirre (died Jaruco, 1896) was a Cuban soldier in the Cuban War of Independence (1895–1898), the last of three liberation wars that Cuba fought against Spain. He was with Enrique Collazo and was connected with the newspaper Protesta. After being wounded in 1896 he died of pneumonia out in the lomas of Jaruco. The José María Aguirre T9 medical school is named in his honour.

References

es:José María Aguirre Valdés

Cuban revolutionaries
1896 deaths
Year of birth missing
Deaths from pneumonia in Cuba